A list of notable astronomers from Slovenia:

A 
 Anton Ambschel (1749–1821)

B 
 Franc Breckerfeld (1681–1744)
 Silvo Breskvar (1902–1969)

Č 
 Andrej Čadež (born 1942)
 Lavo Čermelj (1889–1980)

G 
 Andreja Gomboc (born 1969)
 Pavel Grošelj (1883–1940)
 Gabriel Gruber (1740–1805)

H 
 Ferdinand Augustin Hallerstein (1703–1774)

K 
 Josip Križan (1841–1921)
 Pavel Kunaver (1889–1988)

P 
 Marijan Prosen (born 1937)

S 
 Uros Seljak (born 1966)

V 

 Jurij Vega (1754–1802)

 
Astronomers
Slovenia